Bohdan Stefan Winiarski (27 April 1884 in Bohdanów, Łomża County – 4 December 1969 in Poznań) was a Polish politician, jurist and former President of the International Court of Justice.

Life and career
Winiarski studied law nationally at the Jagiellonian University and the University of Warsaw and did studies of the same studies overseas at the University of Paris and Heidelberg University. After obtaining Ph.D., Winiarski started working at the University of Poznań, obtaining ranks of deputy professor in 1921 and associate professor in 1922. In 1930, Winiarski became full professor of public international law and from 1936 to 1939 served as dean of the Faculty of Law and Economics. During those years, he also served as vice chairman of the League of Nations Communications and Transport Committee and chairman of the League of Nations Inland Navigation Law Committee. During World War II he settled in Great Britain where he served as the President of the Polish Bank under London Government. In 1946, Winiarski was elected to the International Court of Justice in The Hague, and then served as its president from 1961 to 1964. Winiarski was also a professor at the Academy of International Law in The Hague, and was a member of the Institut de Droit International, the Polish Academy of Learning and the Polish Academy of Sciences.

References

1884 births
1969 deaths
Polish jurists
Jagiellonian University alumni
University of Warsaw alumni
University of Paris alumni
Heidelberg University alumni
Academic staff of Adam Mickiewicz University in Poznań
Presidents of the International Court of Justice
Association of the Polish Youth "Zet" members
National Party (Poland) politicians
Polish judges of United Nations courts and tribunals
Members of the Institut de Droit International
Members of the Polish Academy of Learning
Members of the Polish Academy of Sciences